Sculptor Capital Management (formerly Och-Ziff Capital Management Group) is an American global diversified alternative asset management firm.  They are one of the largest institutional alternative asset managers in the world.  The firm operates multiple investment strategies, including multi-strategy, credit and real estate. It has nearly 400 employees worldwide including offices in New York City, London, Hong Kong, Mumbai, and Shanghai.

, the firm has $38.1 billion in assets under management.

Structure
In 2021, Jimmy Levin was appointed CEO of the company.  The firm is managed by the Partner Management Committee of seven executives.

The Company currently manages multi-strategy funds, dedicated credit funds, including opportunistic credit funds and Institutional Credit Strategies products, real estate funds and other alternative investment vehicles, including managing collateralized loan obligations. The company manages $11.4 billion in multi-strategy funds, $6.4 billion in an opportunistic credit fund, $15.2 billion in institutional credit strategies, and $4.3 billion in real estate funds.

History 
The firm was founded as Och-Ziff in 1994 by Daniel Och with financial support from the Ziff family, founders of Ziff Davis Media. The company completed an initial public offering in 2007. The firm was one of the few hedge funds and private equity companies that completed IPOs before the market downturn of 2007. Also in 2007, it became a founding member of the Hedge Fund Standards Board which sets a voluntary code of standards of best practice endorsed by its members. 

In September 2016, the firm entered into settlement agreements with the United States Securities and Exchange Commission (SEC) and Department of Justice, ending a five-year investigation into violations of the Foreign Corrupt Practices Act for allegedly paying bribes to government officials in several African nations. As part of the deferred prosecution agreement that settled civil and criminal charges, the firm agreed to pay a $413 million fine. The African subsidiary of the firm also pleaded guilty to one count of conspiracy. Och was charged by the SEC with causing a books and record violation and paid $2.2m in disgorgement as part of the settlement. After the settlement, the company restructured its leadership. In March of 2019, founder and then-Chairman Dan Och stepped down, and in September of 2019, the firm rebranded as Sculptor Capital Management.  

In January 2018, Michael Cohen, former head of Och Ziff’s European operations, was charged with fraud relating to activities of the company in Africa. He was charged with ten counts of fraud including investment adviser fraud and conspiracy to commit wire fraud while employed by Och Ziff. The SEC sued Michael Cohen as part of their probe into Och Ziff, specifically relating to an Och Ziff bribery scheme in the Democratic Republic of Congo, Chad and Libya, to win business for the company.

On September 12, 2019, the company changed its name from Och-Ziff Capital Management to Sculptor Capital Management. On May 15, 2019, Cohen pled guilty to one count of making false statements to the DOJ and was sentenced to three months; the other charges against him by the DOJ were dismissed.

In January 2021, Sculptor became a signatory of the UNPRI as an investment manager. Since the PRI's founding in 2006, various concerns have been raised over whether or not there is sufficient reporting and accountability among the signatories for membership to be meaningful, though in 2020 the PRI leadership finally began removing firms who did not meet the minimum requirements.

See also
List of hedge funds

References

External links
 

Financial services companies established in 1994
Companies listed on the New York Stock Exchange
Hedge fund firms in New York City
Hedge funds
2007 initial public offerings